David Poppleton is an English former footballer.

Career

After winning the FA Youth Cup with Everton, Poppleton signed for Lincoln City in the Football League Third Division to get more game time. However, he soon sustained an injury and retired from professional football at the end of 1999–2000 because he was "disillusioned with football".

References

External links
 David Poppleton at Soccer Base

English footballers
Living people
Association football midfielders
Everton F.C. players
Lincoln City F.C. players
English Football League players
Year of birth missing (living people)